Sabrina Jalees (born April 19, 1985) is a Canadian comedian, actress, and writer. She has written for various series, and starred as a main cast member alongside Patricia Heaton in the 2019 TV comedy series Carol's Second Act.

Early life and education
The daughter of a Swiss mother and a Pakistani father, she graduated from Earl Haig Secondary School, and later from the Radio and Television Arts program at Ryerson University (now Toronto Metropolitan University) in June 2007.

Career 
Jalees wrote a weekly column in the Toronto Star's ID section.

She has made many Canadian media appearances, including as a commentator on MuchMusic's Video on Trial, Stars On Trial and  LOL!, as well as a role in the drama series Flashpoint, and Jian Ghomeshi's Monday correspondent on CBC Radio One's Sounds Like Canada in the Summer. She also previously filed a regular segment on Go. She is a former host (until 2010) of  Laugh Out Loud on CBC Radio One and a reality TV show for children, In Real Life, airing on YTV. She made a cameo in the video for the song Break This by Hunter Valentine. She narrates the CBBC series Rank the Prank.

She was a writer for Canada's Got Talent and Fraggle Rock: Back to the Rock.

In 2020, she appeared in an episode of Canada's Drag Race, as co-judge of a mini-challenge in the episode "The Snow Ball".

In 2021, she was announced as one of the judges in the upcoming first season of Roast Battle Canada.

Personal life 
Jalees came out as a lesbian and was shunned by her extended Muslim family, an experience she relates in her 2013 Canadian comedy tour, "Brownlisted." Her wife, Shauna McCann, is a fashion designer. They have a son named Wolfie.

Filmography

Film

Television

References

External links

1985 births
Living people
Actresses from Toronto
Canadian columnists
Canadian actresses of Pakistani descent
Canadian people of Swiss descent
Canadian sketch comedians
Canadian stand-up comedians
Canadian women comedians
Canadian television actresses
Toronto Metropolitan University alumni
CBC Radio hosts
Comedians from Toronto
Canadian lesbian actresses
Canadian LGBT broadcasters
Lesbian comedians
Pakistani LGBT people
Canadian women radio hosts
Canadian women columnists
21st-century Canadian comedians
Canadian LGBT comedians
21st-century Canadian LGBT people